The WHO Hub for Pandemic and Epidemic Intelligence was established by the Director-General of the World Health Organization and Chancellor of Germany in 2021 in response to the COVID-19 pandemic.

See also 
 Scientific Advisory Group for Origins of Novel Pathogens
 Independent Panel for Pandemic Preparedness and Response

References 

World Health Organization
Public health
Health policy
Organizations established for the COVID-19 pandemic
International responses to the COVID-19 pandemic
Scientific and technical responses to the COVID-19 pandemic